Jorge Martínez Busch (13 September 1936 – 14 October 2011) was a Chilean Navy admiral and member of the Government Junta that ruled Chile from 1973 to 1990. He served briefly as a member and the President the junta in 1990, after the retirement of admiral José Toribio Merino. He also served as the Commander-in-Chief of the Chilean Navy from 1990 until 1997.

He completed a master's degree in global history at the Pontifical Catholic University of Valparaíso. Similarly, he has made many publications in scientific magazines of that institution.

Footnotes

1936 births
2011 deaths
Chilean admirals
20th-century Chilean Navy personnel
Arturo Prat Naval Academy alumni
Pontifical Catholic University of Valparaíso alumni